Pavel Golovenko (born 12 January 1997) is a Belarusian professional footballer who plays for Żyrardowianka Żyrardów.

References

External links
 
 

1997 births
Living people
Belarusian footballers
Association football goalkeepers
Belarusian expatriate footballers
Expatriate footballers in Poland
FC Minsk players
FC Lida players
FC Arsenal Dzerzhinsk players